Johan Anthony Willem "Hans" Kamp (born 5 September 1940) is a Dutch philosopher and linguist, responsible for introducing discourse representation theory (DRT) in 1981.

Kamp was born in Den Burg. He received a Ph.D. in Philosophy from UCLA in 1968, and has taught at Cornell University, University of London, University of Texas, Austin, and University of Stuttgart. His dissertation, Tense Logic and the Theory of Linear Order (1968) was devoted to functional completeness in tense logic, the main result being that all temporal operators are definable in terms of "since" and "until", provided that the underlying temporal structure is a continuous linear ordering. Kamp's 1971 paper on "now" (published in Theoria) was the first employment of double-indexing in model theoretic semantics. His doctoral committee included Richard Montague as chairman, Chen Chung Chang, Alonzo Church, David Kaplan, Yiannis N. Moschovakis, and Jordan Howard Sobel.

Kamp became a corresponding member of the Royal Netherlands Academy of Arts and Sciences in 1997. He was awarded the Jean Nicod Prize in 1996 and was elected a Fellow of the American Academy of Arts & Sciences in 2015.

Publications
 Kamp, Hans. 'A Theory of Truth and Semantic Representation'. In J. Groenendijk and others (eds.). Formal Methods in the Study of Language. Amsterdam: Mathematics Center, 1981.
 Kamp, Hans and Uwe Reyle. `From Discourse to Logic: Introduction to Modeltheoretic Semantics of Natural Language, Formal Logic and Discourse Representation Theory'. Dordrecht: Kluwer Academic Publishers, 1994.

See also 
 Anaphora (linguistics)
 Donkey pronoun
 Donkey sentence
 Irene Heim
 Lambda calculus
 Montague grammar
 Quantification (linguistics)
 Two-dimensional semantics

References 

1940 births
Living people
People from Texel
Linguists from the Netherlands
20th-century Dutch philosophers
Semanticists
Jean Nicod Prize laureates
Members of the Royal Netherlands Academy of Arts and Sciences
University of California, Los Angeles alumni
Academic staff of the University of Stuttgart